The Scottish Handball League is the premier handball competition for teams in Scotland. The league is regulated by the Scottish Handball Association and is based on a standard round robin format with each team playing one another twice with 2 points awarded for a win and 1 point for a draw.

Scottish teams
 Aberdeen RGU HC
 Ayr
 Cumbernauld
 Dumfries
 Dundee Handball Club
 Edinburgh
 EK82 Handball Club
 Glasgow Handball Club
 Gracemount
 Liberton
 Livingston
 Tryst 77

Scottish National League Champions

Scottish League Season 2009–10

League Table 2009–10

Scottish League Season 2010–11

Men's League table 2010–11

Ladies' League Table 2010–11

Scottish League Season 2011–12

Scottish League Season 2014–15

Men's League table 2014–15

See also
2009–10 Scottish handball season
2010–11 Scottish handball season
2011–12 Scottish handball season

References

External links
 Scottish Handball Association Official site
 A Handball Blog with entries related to Scottish Handball
 Official Site of the European Handball Association
 Scottish Handball Association, National Governing Body

Handball competitions in Scotland
Han
Leagues